is a yaoi manga series by Yuki Shimizu.  It is published in Japanese by Shinshokan and in English by 801 Media. It has been adapted into a drama CD.

Plot

Volume list

Reception 
"The art conveys that ZE is tense and dramatic without being overly melodramatic, and the story emphasizes character over sex as much as any other yaoi I’ve ever read." — Leroy Douresseaux, Comic Book Bin.
"While ZE has its flaws, I ultimately found it to be enjoyable and thought it improved in the second volume." — Michelle Smith, Pop Culture Shock.
"The art style is engaging, with varied characters, and fun. It’s deliciously risqué but doesn’t sacrifice the tenderness between characters either when the moment turns romantic and not only erotic." — Rachel Bentham, activeAnime.

References

External links 

2004 manga
Yaoi anime and manga
Shinshokan manga
Digital Manga Publishing titles